Ciołek (Polish for "bull calf") is a Polish coat of arms, one of the oldest in medieval Poland. It was used by many szlachta (noble) families under the late Piast dynasty, under the Polish–Lithuanian Commonwealth, during the Partitions of Poland, and in the 20th century. The variant names "Siolek" and "Cialek" arose from miscommunication among early-20th-century Polish immigrants to the United States.

History
A history of this coat-of-arms is included in a Short History of Polish Arms written by Countess Ewa Theresa Korab-Karpinska in the late 1980s, which is currently lodged at the College of Arms in London. As heraldic heiress and only daughter of Tadeusz Josef Żeleński (also spelled Zielinski/Zelinski), Ewa was one of a handful of women to write upon the subject of heraldry. The bull and crown were later exceptionally incorporated as a crest into an English Grant of Arms by the English College of Arms.

Blazon

Notable bearers
Notable bearers of this coat of arms have included:
 Gerard Ciołek
 Poniatowski family
 Andrzej Poniatowski
 Izabella Poniatowska
 Józef Antoni Poniatowski
 Michał Jerzy Poniatowski
 Stanisław Poniatowski (1676–1762)
 Stanisław Poniatowski (1754–1833)
 Stanisław August Poniatowski, last King of Poland
 Zbigniew J. Lipowski (1925–1997)
 Tadeusz Boy-Żeleński
 Żeleński family
 Count Tadeusz Josef Żeleński
 Countess Ewa Theresa Żeleńska Korab-Karpinska
 Countess Sarah Elżbieta Philimina Korab-Karpinska Żeleńska Eagan

Gallery

See also
 Polish heraldry
 Heraldic family
 List of Polish nobility coats of arms
 Taurus Poniatovii

Bibliography
 Alfred Znamierowski: Herbarz rodowy. Warszawa: Świat Książki, 2004, s. 96. .
 Tadeusz Gajl, 2003. Polskie rody szlacheckie i ich herby. Białystok: Dom Wydawniczy Benkowski.
 Tadeusz Gajl: Herbarz polski od średniowiecza do XX wieku : ponad 4500 herbów szlacheckich 37 tysięcy nazwisk 55 tysięcy rodów. L&L, 2007, s. 406-539. .
 Jardetzky, Oleg. 1992. The Ciolek of Poland. Graz, Austria: Akademische Druck-u. Verlagsanstalt.  (A detailed book summarizing available documents from Polish, German, Russian and French archives. It deals with the Ciołek clan genealogy during the period c. 800 – c. 1450 AD, 244 pages)
 Sławomir Górzyński: Arystokracja polska w Galicji: studium heraldyczno-genealogiczne. Warszawa: DiG, 2009, s. 195-196. .
 Józef Szymański: Herbarz rycerstwa polskiego z XVI wieku. Warszawa: DiG, 2001, s. 41. .

References

External links
 The Historical Geography of the Ciołek clan AD 950-1950.
  
  

Polish coats of arms